Dwight Stewart (born 28 April 1983) is a Jamaican cricketer. He played in one first-class match for the Jamaican cricket team in 2005.

See also
 List of Jamaican representative cricketers

References

External links
 

1983 births
Living people
Jamaican cricketers
Jamaica cricketers
People from Clarendon Parish, Jamaica